Major general is a two-star general officer rank in the Indian Army. It is the third-highest active rank in the Indian Army. A major general ranks above the one-star rank of brigadier and below the three-star rank of lieutenant general.

The equivalent rank in the Indian Navy is rear admiral and in the Indian Air Force is air vice marshal.

Appointments
Officers in the rank of major general hold important appointments like general officer commanding a division. The Indian Army has 40 divisions in 14 corps. The general officers commanding sub areas across the country are also of the rank of major general. At army headquarters, major generals hold the appointments of additional director general in different directorates and staff branches.

Insignia
The badges of rank have a crossed sword and baton and a five-pointed star above. A major general wears gorget patches which are crimson patches with two golden stars.

Order of precedence
A major general who is a principal staff officer ranks at No. 25 in the Indian order of precedence. Other major generals are at No. 26 in the order of precedence.

Major generals are at pay level 14, with a monthly pay between ₹144,200 (US$1,950) and ₹218,200 (US$2,950).

Rank insignia and personal flag

See also
 List of serving generals of the Indian Army
 Army ranks and insignia of India
 General officer commanding

References

India Army
Indian Army
Indian generals
Military ranks of the Indian Army
Two-star officers